The Minnesota Comprehensive Assessments— Series II (MCA-II) are the state tests measuring student progress for districts to meet the NCLB requirements. Mathematics are tested in grades 3-8 and 11. Reading is assessed in grades 3–8, writing in grade 9, and science is given in grades 5 and 8.

Students take one test in each academic subject. Most students take the MCA, but students who receive special education services and meet eligibility criteria may take the MCA-Modified or the MTAS.

References

Education in Minnesota
Standardized tests in the United States